Dagoretti North Constituency is one of 17 electoral constituency of Nairobi County. It was created by the Independent Electoral and Boundaries Commission before the 2013 general election. Most of the area that forms Dagoretti North constituency was part of Westlands Constituency. A smaller portion of it was hived off from Dagoretti Constituency.

Wards

References

External links 

List of Constituencies of Kenya
Social Audit of the constituency

Constituencies in Nairobi
2013 establishments in Kenya
Constituencies established in 2013

sw:Eneo Bunge la Westlands